Spanish Harbor Key is an island in the lower Florida Keys.

U.S. 1 (the Overseas Highway) crosses the keys at approximately mile markers 35–36, between Bahia Honda Key and West Summerland Key.

Originally, there were three keys at this location.  They were connected by fills at the time the Overseas Railroad was built.  The Keys were West Summerland Key (westernmost), Middle Summerland Key (center), and an unnamed easternmost key.  West Summerland retains its name, but the other two are known simply as the Spanish Harbor Keys; named for the anchorage located between this key and Big Pine Key.  Interesting features of this key include Indian mounds and storage buildings still standing from the Flagler Railway construction era.

References

Uninhabited islands of Monroe County, Florida
Islands of Florida